William Edmonds may refer to:

William Edmonds (colonel) (died 1606), Scottish-born army officer in the Dutch States Army
William Edmonds (MP) for Reading
Bill Edmonds (1903–1968), Australian politician

See also
William Edmond (1755–1838), US Representative
William Edmunds (disambiguation)